5 is the fifth studio album by electronic music band Lamb, released on 5 May 2011 by Strata, after a 5-year hiatus.

Recording and production
The record was the first album from the band after they reformed in 2009.

Critical reception

The Independent found that little had changed since their split, with the band still sounding middle-class and unthreatening, although singer Lou Rhodes's voice was sounding more like Stevie Nicks.

Track listing

Notes
 "The Spectacle" contains 20 seconds of silence at the end of the track.
 "The Spectacle (Reprise)" is not stated on the back cover of the physical releases.
 Disc one of the limited edition omits "Back to Beginning" and "The Spectacle (Reprise)" and features them as track 2 and track 9 on the disc two respectively.

Personnel
Credits adapted from liner notes of 5.

Musicians
 Andy Barlow – beats, synthesizers, samplers, keyboards
 Lou Rhodes – vocals, guitars
 Danny Keane – strings, string arrangements ; rhodes ; additional piano 
 John Thorne – double bass 
 Yoav – additional guitars 
 Stuart Ryan – guitars 
 String section 
 Chris Worsey, Emil Chakolov, Emlyn Singleton, Everton Nelson, Jon Thorne, Max Baille, Nina Foster, Oli Langford

Technical personnel
 Andy Barlow – production; mixing 
 Simon Changer – engineering 
 Ali Staton – mixing ; additional mixing 
 Dave Greennerg – mastering

Artwork
 Lou Rhodes – design, booklet photography
 Nick Tomlinson – design, booklet photography
 Notion23 – design
 Claudia Crobatia – cover photography

References

External links
 

2011 albums
Lamb (band) albums